Kim Gyu-ri (born Kim Moon-sun on 27 June 1979), is a South Korean actress.

Filmography

Film 
 Where Are To Go? (2013)
 My Darling FBI (2008)
 Tarzan Park Heung-sook (2005)
 Bunshinsaba (2004)
 Libera Me (2000)
 Nightmare (2000)
 Weathering the Storms (1999)
 Whispering Corridors (1998)

Television series 
Lights and Shadows (MBC, 2011-2012)
Can't Stop Now (MBC, 2009)
Lovers (SBS, 2006)
Immortal Admiral Yi Sun-sin (KBS1, 2004)
Children of Heaven (KBS2, 2002)
Sun-hee and Jin-hee (MBC, 2001)
Medical Center (SBS, 2000)
Popcorn (SBS, 2000)
Roses and Bean Sprouts (MBC, 1999)
Because I Love You (SBS, 1997)
Spin (KBS2, 1997)
One Fine Spring Day (KBS2, 1997)
Hometown of Legends - 90s Series (KBS2, 1996)
LA Arirang (SBS, 1995)
Reporting for Duty (KBS2, 1994)

Music video
Choi Jin-young - "영원" (1999)
Kim Min-jong - "Pure" (1999)

Awards
1999 22nd Golden Cinematography Awards: Best New Actress (Whispering Corridors)
1999 7th Chunsa Film Art Awards: Best New Actress (Whispering Corridors)

References

External links 
 
 
 

South Korean film actresses
South Korean television actresses
1979 births
Living people
Chung-Ang University alumni
20th-century South Korean actresses
21st-century South Korean actresses